Tim Bignell is an Australian bass guitarist from the Ballarat-based band Epicure.

References

Living people
Year of birth missing (living people)
Australian rock bass guitarists
Male bass guitarists
Australian male guitarists